Nationality words link to articles with information on the nation's poetry or literature (for instance, Irish or France).

Events
 Colley Cibber made British Poet Laureate

Works published

English, Colonial America
 Ebenezer Cooke (attributed; also spelled "Cook"), Sotweed Redivivus, or, The Planters Looking-Glass by E. C. Gent, a verse treatise on tobacco cultivation and the problems of the planters of Maryland; thought to be by the author of The Sot-Weed Factor 1708, although the two pieces differ widely in tone, English Colonial America The idea for the 1960 novel The Sot-Weed Factor by John Barth was based on Barth's reading of Cooke's poem
 Richard Lewis, "A Journey from Patapsco to Annapolis, April 4, 1730", called one of the best nature poems in English Colonial American literature

United Kingdom
 John Banks, The Weaver's Miscellany
 Stephen Duck, Poems on Several Subjects (including "The Thresher's Labour")
 Walter Harte, Essay on Satire, criticism in verse
 Aaron Hill, The Progress of Wit
 George Lyttelton, 1st Baron Lyttelton, An Epistle to Mr. Pope, published anonymously
 Matthew Pilkington, Poems on Several Occasions
 Jonathan Swift, A Libel on D---- D--------, and a Certain Great Lord, published anonymously; a satire on Patrick Delany's Epistle to His Excellency John Lord Carteret of 1729 [although that book states "1730"]; see also An Epistle Upon an Epistle 1729)
 Elizabeth Thomas, The Metamorphosis of the Town; or, A View of the Present Fashions, published anonymously* "Scriblerus Tertius" a pen name, possibly of Thomas Cooke, The Candidates for the Bays
 James Thomson, The Seasons, a Hymn, A Poem to the Memory of Sir Isaac Newton, and Britannia, a Poem, including "Autumn" (see also Winter 1726, Summer 1727, Spring 1728)
 "Scriblerus Tertius" a pen name, possibly of Thomas Cooke, The Candidates for the Bays
 Edward Young, Two Epistles to Mr. Pope, published anonymously

Other
 Johann Christoph Gottsched, Versuch einer kritischen Dichtkunst für die Deutschen ("Critical Essay on German Poetry"), the first systematic treatise in German on the art of poetry from the standpoint of Nicolas Boileau-Despréaux

Births
Death years link to the corresponding "[year] in poetry" article:
 January 9 – John Scott of Amwell (died 1783), English Quaker poet and friend of Samuel Johnson
 March 27 – Thomas Tyrwhitt (died 1786) English classical scholar and critic
 April 1 – Solomon Gessner (died 1788), Swiss painter and German-language poet
 June 21 – Motoori Norinaga 本居宣長 (died 1801), Japanese Edo period scholar of Kokugaku, physician and poet (surname: Motoori)
 November 10 – Oliver Goldsmith (died 1774), Anglo-Irish writer, poet, and physician
 Also:
 Charlotte Lennox (died 1804), British writer and poet (born in Gibraltar to Scottish and Irish parents)
 Tarikonda Venkamamba (died 1817), Telugu poet (a woman)
 year uncertain – Lucy Terry (died 1821), born in Africa, enslaved at age 5, first known African American poet, author of "Bars Fight, August 28, 1746", a ballad first printed in 1855

Deaths
Birth years link to the corresponding "[year] in poetry" article:
 July 16 – Elijah Fenton (born 1683), English poet
 September 27 – Laurence Eusden (born 1688), English Poet Laureate
 December 14 – Sophia Elisabet Brenner (born 1659), Swedish writer, poet, feminist and salon hostess
 unknown date:
 Nedîm (born 1681), Ottoman poet
 Vemana (born 1652), Telugu poet

See also

 Poetry
 List of years in poetry
 List of years in literature
 18th century in poetry
 18th century in literature
 Augustan poetry
 Scriblerus Club

Notes

 "A Timeline of English Poetry" Web page of the Representative Poetry Online Web site, University of Toronto

18th-century poetry
Poetry